Rathcormac is a small town in north County Cork, Ireland. Previously situated on the main Cork to Dublin road (the N8), it was bypassed in 2006 by the M8. The former N8 through the town's main street is now the R639 regional road. Rathcormac is located in the Blackwater Valley region and is part of the Cork East Dáil constituency.

History
The Rathcormac massacre occurred at Bartlemy Cross southeast of Rathcormac on 18 December 1834, during the Tithe War.

Carntierna, an Iron Age royal site, is located to the north.

Sports
Rathcormac is home to Bride Rovers GAA club and Rathcormac Gun Club.

People
In 1842 the Fenian and Australian architect, Joseph Nunan, was born here.

Two Canadian politicians, Patrick Joseph (Joe) O'Flynn (1921) and Denis Christopher O'Flynn (1923), were born in Rathcormac to John Joseph O'Flynn and Mary Cahill. In 1925, The O'Flynn family immigrated to Toronto, Ontario Canada.  When the family landed in Canada, they dropped the "O" and became Flynn.

Joe O'Flynn went on to be elected to the Canadian House of Commons as the Member of Parliament for Kitchener, Ontario and Dennis O'Flynn (he changed the spelling) became Mayor of Etobicoke (a suburb of Toronto) and later was the Chairman of Metropolitan Toronto.

See also 

 List of towns and villages in Ireland

References 

Towns and villages in County Cork